Young Cassidy is a 1965 British biography drama film directed by Jack Cardiff and starring Rod Taylor, Julie Christie, and Maggie Smith. It is a biographical drama based upon the life of the playwright Seán O'Casey.

Plot
Set in 1911 and the growing protest against British rule in Ireland, young John Cassidy (Seán O'Casey) is a labourer by day and a pamphleteer by night. When the pamphlets he has written incite riots, Cassidy realizes he can do more for his people with the pen than with the sword. He writes a new play, The Plough and the Stars, which he submits to the Abbey Theatre (which had already rejected another of his plays, The Shadow of a Gunman), and is surprised when W. B. Yeats, the founder of the Abbey, accepts and produces his new play. The opening of the play causes the audience to riot, and he loses many friends; but he is undeterred and is soon acclaimed as Ireland's outstanding young playwright.

Cast
 Rod Taylor as John Cassidy
 Maggie Smith as Nora
 Julie Christie as Daisy Battles
 Michael Redgrave as W.B. Yeats
 Edith Evans as Augusta, Lady Gregory
 T. P. McKenna as Tom
 Jack MacGowran as Archie
 Siân Phillips as Ella
 Flora Robson as Mrs. Cassidy

Production
As early as 1907, performances of John Millington Synge's The Playboy of the Western World resulted in riots by theatergoers, which had to be quelled by police. The real W. B Yeats, a friend of both authors, said similar words at or after both riots. Young Cassidy brings this parallel history (the riots of The Plough and the Stars and The Playboy of the Western World) to vivid life, tied together by the character of Yeats.

Based on Seán O'Casey's autobiography Mirror in my House (the umbrella title under which the six autobiographies he published from 1939 to 1956 were republished, in two large volumes, in 1956), the movie began production in 1964, changing his name in the film to John Cassidy. O'Casey had read earlier drafts of the movie, and gave his approval to the script, as well as to the choice of lead actor, Rod Taylor.

Rod Taylor stepped in when the original choice for the role, Sean Connery, had to drop out because of scheduling conflicts with the James Bond movie Goldfinger. Prior to Connery, Richard Harris was attached.

The movie was initially directed by John Ford (who had already directed a movie version of The Plough and the Stars in 1936), but he fell ill about two weeks into production and was replaced by Jack Cardiff. Filming was held up for two weeks. Only one member of the cast was replaced – Sian Phillips came in for Siobhán McKenna. O'Casey died shortly before production on the film finished.

Sean O'Casey: The Spirit of Ireland
During the making of the film, a behind-the-scenes documentary, Sean O'Casey: The Spirit of Ireland, was filmed looking at the making of Young Cassidy. Narrated by Herschel Bernardi, the film intersperses footage from Young Cassidy with footage of the actors preparing for their roles.

Reception
John Simon of The New Leader wrote that Young Cassidy is 'a well-meaning but fairly lackluster pseudo-or-screen biography' and 'There is one very effective scene of a street riot and its bloody suppression, but the Easter Rising falls flat'.

Home media
Young Cassidy was released to DVD by Warner Home Video on 6 September 2012 via the Warner Archive DVD-on-demand system available through Amazon.

See also
 List of British films of 1965

References

External links
 
 
 

1965 films
1960s biographical drama films
British biographical drama films
1960s English-language films
Films based on works by Seán O'Casey
Films directed by Jack Cardiff
Films set in 1911
Films set in Ireland
Metro-Goldwyn-Mayer films
1965 drama films
Films shot at MGM-British Studios
1960s British films